The blood–thymus barrier regulates exchange of substances between the circulatory system and thymus, providing a sequestered environment for immature T cells to develop. The barrier also prevents the immature T cells from contacting foreign antigens (since contact with antigens at this stage will cause the T cells to die by apoptosis).

The barrier is formed by the continuous blood capillaries in the thymic cortex, reinforced by type 1 epithelial reticular cells (sometimes called thymic epithelial cells) and macrophages.

The existence of this barrier was first proposed in 1961 and demonstrated to exist in mice in 1963.

References

See also
 
 
 
 
 

Thorax (human anatomy)
Organs (anatomy)